The Col des Aravis is a mountain pass in the French Alps that connects the towns of La Clusaz in Haute-Savoie with La Giettaz in Savoie. At 1487 m it is the lowest pass in the Aravis Range of mountains.

Appearances in Tour de France (Since 1947)
The pass has been used 41 times in the Tour de France, most recently in 2020. In 1948 Gino Bartali was the first rider over the pass.

See also
 List of highest paved roads in Europe
 List of mountain passes
 Souvenir Henri Desgrange

References

External links 
Col des Aravis on Google Maps (Tour de France classic climbs)

Aravis
Landforms of Haute-Savoie
Landforms of Savoie
Transport in Auvergne-Rhône-Alpes
Aravis